Storey is a surname. Notable people with the surname include

 Awvee Storey, former American professional basketball player and assistant coach
 Barney Storey
 Barron Storey
 Bobby Storey
 Charles Ambrose Storey, 1888–1968, academic
 Christopher Storey, 1981, National Record Holding Powerlifter
 David Storey
 Elsdon Storey
 Edward Farris Storey
 Gerry Storey
 Ian Storey-Moore
 John Storey (disambiguation)
 Llewelyn Robert Owen Storey
 Marcus Storey
 Margaret Hamilton Storey
 Mark Storey
 Maureen Storey
 Mike Storey
 Moorfield Storey
 Peter Storey
 Red Storey
 Rob Storey
 Robert D. Storey
 Samuel Storey
 Sarah Storey
 Sean Storey
 Sid Storey
 Simon Storey
 William Benson Storey

See also
 Storey (disambiguation)
 Story (surname)

English-language surnames